Bocarić is a Serbian surname. Notable people with the surname include:

Anastas Bocarić (1864–1944), Serbian painter
Špiro Bocarić (1876–1941), Serbian painter, brother of Anastas

Serbian surnames